James Oliver Cromwell (born January 27, 1940) is an American actor and activist. Some of his best-known films include Babe (1995), Star Trek: First Contact (1996), L.A. Confidential (1997), The Green Mile (1999), The Queen (2006), W. (2008), Secretariat (2010), The Artist (2011), Big Hero 6 (2014), and Jurassic World: Fallen Kingdom (2018). 

Cromwell is also well known for his performances in television including HBO’s acclaimed Angels in America (2003), Six Feet Under (2003–2005), American Horror Story: Asylum (2012–2013), Succession (2018–present), and Counterpart (2018–2019).

Cromwell has been nominated for five Primetime Emmy Awards and four Screen Actors Guild Awards, as well as an Academy Award for Best Supporting Actor for Babe (1995). He won a Primetime Emmy Award for his role in American Horror Story: Asylum (2012) and a Canadian Screen Award for Best Actor for his role in Still Mine (2013).

Early life and education
Cromwell was born in Los Angeles, California. He is the son of actress Kay Johnson (19041975) and actor and director John Cromwell (18861979), who was blacklisted during the McCarthy era. His parents divorced in 1946. He has English, German, Irish, and Scottish ancestry. He graduated from The Hill School in 1958, and went on to Middlebury College, and Carnegie Mellon University, where he graduated with a B.F.A. in 1964. He received his acting training at HB Studio in New York City. Like his parents, he was drawn to the theatre, performing in everything from Shakespeare to experimental plays.

Career
Cromwell's first television performance was in a 1974 episode of The Rockford Files playing Terry, a tennis instructor. A few weeks later, he began a recurring role as Stretch Cunningham on All in the Family. In 1975, he took his first lead role on television as Bill Lewis in the short-lived Hot l Baltimore, and appeared on M*A*S*H as Captain Leo Bardonaro in the episode "Last Laugh". A year later, he made his film debut in Neil Simon's classic detective spoof Murder by Death. Cromwell portrayed four different characters in four episodes of Barney Miller (1977-1981). 
In 1977 he appeared in Three's Company episode- "Chrissy's Night Out" as Detective Lannigan.

In 1980, Cromwell guest-starred in the two-part episode "Laura Ingalls Wilder" of the long-running television series Little House on the Prairie. He played Harve Miller, one of Almanzo Wilder's old friends.

While Cromwell continued with regular television work throughout the 1980s, he made appearances in films with supporting roles in Tank and Revenge of the Nerds (both 1984). He guest starred on the sitcom Night Court, playing a mental patient, along with Kevin Peter Hall. He had starring roles in the critically acclaimed films Babe (1995), The People vs. Larry Flynt (1996), The Education of Little Tree (1997), L.A. Confidential (1997), The Green Mile (1999), The General's Daughter, (1999) and Snow Falling on Cedars (1999). Cromwell's first Star Trek role was on Star Trek: The Next Generation in 1990, in the season 3 episode "The Hunted", followed by the 1993 episode "Birthright, Part 1" as Jaglom Shrek. He also played Dr. Zefram Cochrane in Star Trek: First Contact (1996), the Star Trek: Enterprise pilot episode "Broken Bow", and the 2022 Star Trek: Lower Decks season 3 premiere episode, "Grounded". The Star Trek: Enterprise episode "In a Mirror, Darkly" reused some of the First Contact footage. Cromwell appeared in another Star Trek role on the television series Deep Space Nine, in the episode "Starship Down" as Hanok. He also voiced the Colonel in DreamWorks' Spirit: Stallion of the Cimarron.

Cromwell's role as newspaper tycoon William Randolph Hearst in the television film RKO 281 earned him an Emmy Award nomination for Outstanding Supporting Actor in a Television Movie. The following year, he received his second Emmy Award nomination for playing Bishop Lionel Stewart on the NBC medical drama series ER. In 2004, he guest-starred as former President D. Wire Newman in The West Wing episode "The Stormy Present". From 2003 to 2005, Cromwell played George Sibley in the HBO drama series Six Feet Under, which earned him his third Emmy Award nomination in 2003. Along with the rest of his castmates, he was also nominated for two Screen Actors Guild Awards for Best Ensemble in a Drama Series in 2005 and 2006. The following year, Cromwell played Prince Philip, Duke of Edinburgh in The Queen (2006), that earned Helen Mirren an Academy Award for Best Actress. He also guest starred as Phillip Bauer, father of lead character Jack, in the sixth season of the Fox thriller drama series 24.

In October 2007, Cromwell played the lead role of James Tyrone Sr. in the Druid Theatre Company's production of Eugene O'Neill's Long Day's Journey into Night, at the Gaiety in Dublin as part of the Ulster Bank Dublin Theatre Festival's 50th Anniversary. That same year he received the King Vidor Memorial Award from the San Luis Obispo International Film Festival for his artistic achievements in film. Cromwell played George H. W. Bush in Oliver Stone's W. (2008), that chronicles the rise to power of Bush's son up until the 2003 invasion of Iraq. Cromwell also provided the voice of the main villain Professor Robert Callaghan/Yokai in the Disney movie Big Hero 6.

In 2015, Cromwell executive produced the documentary Imminent Threat which tackles the War on Terror's impact on civil liberties.

In 2016 Cromwell starred in HBO's series The Young Pope alongside Jude Law and Diane Keaton. In 2018, he appeared in HBO's Succession, and Starz's Counterpart.

In 2020, Cromwell starred in the Australian comedy-drama film Never Too Late. Cromwell starred in Operation Buffalo, an Australian television comedy-drama series about the atomic bomb tests in outback Australia, which screened on ABC from 31 May 2020.

He is currently featured in the HBO Max show Julia, as Julia Child's father, John McWilliams.

In 2021, Cromwell executive produced the psychedelic comedy Mondo Hollywoodland, directed by Janek Ambros, who also directed Imminent Threat.

Activism 
Cromwell has long been an advocate of progressive causes, particularly regarding animal rights. He became a vegetarian in 1974 after seeing a stockyard in Texas and experiencing the "smell, terror and anxiety". He became vegan while playing the character of Farmer Hoggett in the 1995 film Babe. He frequently speaks out on issues regarding animal cruelty for PETA, largely on the treatment of pigs. In 2017, he was arrested during a PETA protest against SeaWorld's treatment of orca whales, at which he spoke about marine mammals' suffering and premature deaths.

In the book Money Men, author Jeffrey Birnbaum describes how John McCain went out of his way to meet Cromwell as he advocated on Capitol Hill for funding of Native American arts education.

Cromwell served as the narrator of the short film Farm to Fridge, a documentary produced by Mercy for Animals.
In February 2013, Cromwell was arrested along with animal rights activist Jeremy Beckham for interrupting a University of Wisconsin Board of Regents meeting while showing a graphic photo of a cat to protest about alleged mistreatment of animals on campus. The incident, which garnered widespread press coverage, was resolved on March 25, 2013, when an attorney representing Cromwell entered no-contest pleas to the non-criminal offense and agreed to pay $100 forfeitures and court costs of $263.50. In December 2015, he was removed from an event in New York for heckling an energy company receiving an award. On December 18, 2015, Cromwell and five other people were arrested while protesting against the construction of a natural gas power station in Wawayanda, New York, near his home in Warwick, New York. He and his fellow protesters, called the "Wawayanda Six", were convicted of disorderly conduct and obstruction of traffic. They were fined $375, due June 29, 2017 and sentenced to 16 hours of community service. After refusing to pay the fine, he was sentenced to a week in jail, scheduled to go on July 14. However, they were released 3 days later on July 17. Cromwell and fellow Star Trek actor J. G. Hertzler were among the 19 people arrested in Watkins Glen, New York on June 6, 2016, for a protest against underground gas storage in salt caverns near Seneca Lake. On June 6, 2017, he was escorted out of a Democratic Party fundraiser (which New York Governor Andrew Cuomo and House Minority leader Nancy Pelosi attended) after disrupting the event by protesting about the power station. Cromwell was again arrested, this time for trespassing after taking part in a protest along with People for the Ethical Treatment of Animals (PETA) at Seaworld on July 24.

On October 31, 2019, Cromwell was again arrested with 34-year-old animal rights activist Jeremy Beckham. They were charged with disorderly conduct after police said they disrupted a meeting of the Texas A&M University System Board of Regents. The two were part of a demonstration by PETA, protesting A&M's use of dogs for medical research. Both were released after posting bonds of $5,000 each.

In May 2022, Cromwell superglued his hand on the counter of a Manhattan Starbucks to protest the surcharge of plant-based milks.  Later that year, PETA named him their 2022 Person of the Year.

Personal life 
Cromwell married Ann Ulvestad in 1977. They divorced in 1986. Together the couple had three children: Kate, John and Colin. Cromwell married actress Julie Cobb on May 29, 1986; they divorced in 2005. On January 1, 2014, Cromwell married actress Anna Stuart at the home of Stuart's former Another World co-star Charles Keating. Cromwell lives in Warwick, New York.

His son John is even taller, standing . In the 2012 film Memorial Day, John played the young Bud Vogel, while James played him as a grandfather, and both Cromwells appear as the same character at different ages in American Horror Story: Asylum (2012) and the first season of Betrayal (2013).

Politics 
Cromwell's experiences of the Civil Rights Movement while on a theatre tour through several Deep South states in 1964 had a profound effect on him. The courage of local campaigners and visiting activists – Cromwell had played high school football with civil rights worker Mickey Schwerner, who was murdered with two of his colleagues in Mississippi in 1964 – convinced him to become an activist. He subsequently became involved in the anti-Vietnam War movement, and by the late 1960s, Cromwell was a member of the Committee to Defend the Panthers, a group organized to defend 13 members of the Black Panther Party who had been imprisoned in New York on charges of conspiracy. All 13 were eventually released. In a 2004 interview with CNN, Cromwell praised the Panthers.

In an October 2008 interview, Cromwell criticized the Republican Party and the George W. Bush administration, saying that their foreign policy would "either destroy us or the entire planet".

He supported the presidential campaign of Bernie Sanders in the 2016 U.S. presidential election.

Filmography

Awards and nominations

See also
 List of animal rights advocates

References

Further reading 
 "Cover Biography for August 2005: James Cromwell", Current Biography, August 2005

External links

 
 
 James Cromwell at Rotten Tomatoes
 
 

1940 births
Living people
Male actors from Los Angeles
Male actors from New York City
American male film actors
American male Shakespearean actors
American male stage actors
American male television actors
American male voice actors
American people of English descent
American people of German descent
American people of Irish descent
American people of Scottish descent
American animal rights activists
People from Manhattan
Carnegie Mellon University College of Fine Arts alumni
The Hill School alumni
Middlebury College alumni
20th-century American male actors
21st-century American male actors
Outstanding Performance by a Supporting Actor in a Miniseries or Movie Primetime Emmy Award winners
Best Actor Genie and Canadian Screen Award winners
Progressivism in the United States
American veganism activists
California Democrats
New York (state) Democrats